The CONCACAF W Championship (previously known as the CONCACAF Women's Championship, CONCACAF Women's Invitational Tournament, CONCACAF Women's Gold Cup and CONCACAF Women's World Cup Qualifying) is an association football competition organized by the Confederation of North, Central American and Caribbean Association Football (CONCACAF) that often serves as the qualifying competition to the Women's World Cup, and recently the Olympics.  In years when the tournament has been held outside the World Cup qualifying cycle, non-CONCACAF members have been invited. CONCACAF is the governing body for football for North America, Central America and the Caribbean. The most successful country has been the United States, winning their ninth title in 2022.

History

2000

Six member women's national teams participated: Canada, the U.S., Costa Rica, Guatemala, Mexico, Trinidad and Tobago, as well as two invited teams, Brazil and China. The United States hosted the tournament and were champions.

2002

The 2002 Women's Gold Cup was an eight-team tournament hosted by Canada and the United States. The two finalists qualified for the 2003 FIFA Women's World Cup and the third-place team qualified for the World Cup playoff. After 16 games (played as 8 doubleheaders) the United States were tournament champions, defeating Canada in overtime in the final. Mia Hamm scored the golden goal, taking the U.S. to their second Women's Gold Cup title. The U.S. had a 9–0–1 Gold Cup record, including 48 goals for and two goals against, both scored by Charmaine Hooper of Canada.

2006

The 2006 CONCACAF Women's Gold Cup was held in the United States, with games being hosted at The Home Depot Center in Carson, California and Tropical Park Stadium in Miami, Florida. This 2007 World Cup qualifying tournament featured six teams in single-elimination, with the top two teams qualifying directly for the 2007 FIFA Women's World Cup in China. Additionally, the third-place finisher played a two-legged home-and-away playoff against Japan (the fourth-place finisher from the Asian Confederation).

2022

The 2022 CONCACAF W Championship was held from 4–18 July 2022 and featured eight teams divided into two groups of four. After single round-robin play, the top two from each group qualified for the knockout rounds, played in a single match direct elimination format. 

The tournament served as a CONCACAF qualifier to the 2023 FIFA Women's World Cup in Australia and New Zealand, the football tournament at the 2024 Summer Olympics in France, and the 2024 CONCACAF W Gold Cup. The top two teams of each round-robin group qualified for the World Cup, while the third-placed teams from each group advanced to the inter-confederation play-offs. The winner of the tournament also qualified for the 2024 Olympics and the 2024 CONCACAF W Gold Cup, while the second and third-placed teams advanced to a CONCACAF Olympic play-off. The winner of that play-off will also guarantee their place at the 2024 Olympics and the 2024 W Gold Cup.

Results

Performance by country

Overall team records
In this ranking 3 points are awarded for a win, 1 for a draw and 0 for a loss. As per statistical convention in football, matches decided in extra time are counted as wins and losses, while matches decided by penalty shoot-outs are counted as draws. Teams are ranked by total points, then by goal difference, then by goals scored.

1 non-CONCACAF invitees

Comprehensive team results by tournament
Legend
  – Champions
  – Runners-up
  – Third place
  – Fourth place
 GS – Group stage
 Q – Qualified for upcoming tournament
  — Hosts

Awards

Winning coaches

See also
 CONCACAF W Gold Cup
 CONCACAF Gold Cup
 CONCACAF Championship

Notes

References

External links

CONCACAF Women's Gold Cup at RSSSF

 
Recurring sporting events established in 1991
Championship